The mixed Chinese postman problem (MCPP or MCP) is the search for the shortest traversal of a graph with a set of vertices V, a set of undirected edges E with positive rational weights, and a set of directed arcs A with positive rational weights that covers each edge or arc at least once at minimal cost. The problem has been proven to be NP-complete by Papadimitriou. The mixed Chinese postman problem often arises in arc routing problems such as snow ploughing, where some streets are too narrow to traverse in both directions while other streets are bidirectional and can be plowed in both directions. It is easy to check if a mixed graph has a postman tour of any size by verifying if the graph is strongly connected. The problem is NP hard if we restrict the postman tour to traverse each arc exactly once or if we restrict it to traverse each edge exactly once, as proved by Zaragoza Martinez.

Mathematical Definition 
The mathematical definition is:

Input: A strongly connected, mixed graph  with cost  for every edge  and a maximum cost .

Computational complexity 
The main difficulty in solving the Mixed Chinese Postman problem lies in choosing orientations for the (undirected) edges when we are given a tight budget for our tour and can only afford to traverse each edge once. We then have to orient the edges and add some further arcs in order to obtain a directed Eulerian graph, that is, to make every vertex balanced. If there are multiple edges incident to one vertex, it is not an easy task to determine the correct orientation of each edge. The mathematician Papadimitriou  analyzed this problem with more restrictions; "MIXED CHINESE POSTMAN is NP-complete, even if the input graph is planar, each vertex has degree at most three, and each edge and arc has cost one."

Eulerian graph 
The process of checking if a mixed graph is Eulerian is important to creating an algorithm to solve the Mixed Chinese Postman problem. The degrees of a mixed graph G must be even to have an Eulerian cycle, but this is not sufficient.

Approximation 
The fact that the Mixed Chinese Postman is NP-hard has led to the search for polynomial time algorithms that approach the optimum solution to reasonable threshold. Frederickson developed a method with a factor of 3/2 that could be applied to planar graphs, and Raghavachari and Veerasamy found a method that does not have to be planar. However, polynomial time cannot find the cost of deadheading, the time it takes a snow plough to reach the streets it will plow or a street sweeper to reach the streets it will sweep.

Formal definition 
Given a strongly connected mixed graph  with a vertex set , and edge set , an arc set  and a nonnegative cost  for each , the MCPP consists of finding a minim-cost tour passing through each link  at least once.

Note that .

It is a well known fact that a mixed graph  is Eulerian if and only if  is even and balanced. Notice that if  is even and symmetric, then G is also balanced (and Eulerian). Moreover, if  is even, the  can be solved exactly in polynomial time.

Even MCPP Algorithm 

Compute  for each vertex i in the directed graph . A vertex   with  will be considered as a source (sink) with supply demand .
 To satisfy the demands  of all the vertices, solve a minimum cost flow problem in the graph , in which each arc in  has infinite capacity and each arc in  has capacity 2. Let  be the optimal flow.
The resulting graph is even and symmetric.

Heuristic algorithms 
When the mixed graph is not even and the nodes do not all have even degree, the graph can be transformed into an even graph.

 Let  be a mixed graph that is strongly connected. Find the odd degree nodes by ignoring the arc directions and obtain a minimal-cost matching. Augment the graph with the edges from the minimal cost matching to generate an even graph . 
 The graph is even but is not symmetric and an eulerian mixed graph is even and symmetric.
 The final step involves making the symmetric graph  even. Label the odd degree nodes . The arcs in  should be considered as undirected edges, not as directed arcs.

Genetic algorithm 
A paper published by Hua Jiang et. al laid out a genetic algorithm to solve the mixed chinese postman problem by operating on a population. The algorithm performed well compared to other approximation algorithms for the MCPP.

See also 

 Capacitated arc routing problem

References 

Computational problems in graph theory